The 1987 Daytona 500, the 29th running of the event, was held February 15 at Daytona International Speedway, in Daytona Beach, Florida. Driving his Coors/Melling #9 Ford Thunderbird, Bill Elliott had a dominant week, winning the pole with a record speed of 210.364 mph, winning the Busch Clash, and finishing second in a photo finish to Ken Schrader in his Twin 125 qualifier  before winning his second Daytona 500.

After numerous crashes in other races that week, the 1987 Daytona 500 was relatively incident free, with only 4 cautions for 15 laps, and no serious wrecks. For the final fifty laps of the race, Elliott, Dale Earnhardt, Benny Parsons, Buddy Baker, Geoff Bodine, Richard Petty and Schrader put on a back and forth duel for the win, resulting in a near record average speed of 176.263 mph for race winner Elliott.

Results

Top Ten Results
 9-Bill Elliott
 35-Benny Parsons
 43-Richard Petty
 88-Buddy Baker
 3-Dale Earnhardt
 22-Bobby Allison
 90-Ken Schrader
 17-Darrell Waltrip
 15-Ricky Rudd
 29-Cale Yarborough

Failed to qualify
18-Tommy Ellis
24-Grant Adcox
32-Jonathan Lee Edwards
39-Blackie Wangerin
41-Ronnie Thomas
48-Steve Moore
49-Delma Cowart
51-David Simko
54-Donnie Allison
62-Steve Christman
74-Bobby Wawak
89-Jim Sauter
93-Charlie Baker
98-Ed Pimm
00-Dick McCabe
02-Joe Booher
09-Jeff Swindell
63-Jocko Maggiacomo (did not start qualifying race).

Recap
 This was the last of the non-restrictor plate Daytona 500's until 2020.
 Bill Elliott dominated much of the race, leading 104 of the 200 laps. During two different points in the race, he pulled away from the other leaders and was all by himself on the track, leading the first 35 laps, 29 in a row at another point, and the last three.
 Benny Parsons finished three car lengths back of Elliott. During the late-race pit stops for fuel, he overshot his pit which cost him several seconds. Parsons was subbing for an ill Tim Richmond in the Hendrick Motorsports Folgers Chevrolet Monte Carlo, renumbered 35 from its usual #25. Parsons also won his Twin 125 mile qualifying race on the Thursday before the Daytona 500. 
 Geoff Bodine led the race with three laps to go after all the front runners had pitted for fuel. His crew chief Gary Nelson told CBS pit reporter Mike Joy that they were not going to pit and would either win or run out of fuel. Bodine won the 1986 Daytona 500 after Dale Earnhardt ran out of fuel with three laps to go. Bodine, though, was largely a non-factor in the rest of the race, only leading 10 laps which were all related to having better fuel mileage than the other competitors.
 Davey Allison made his debut as a rookie in the Ranier Racing #28 T-Bird, and promptly qualified on the outside pole for the race, then finishing 6th in his Twin 125 qualifier. He showed good speed in the 500, running second to leader Elliott early on, before losing a wheel on a botched pit stop and losing several laps for repairs.

References

Daytona 500
Daytona 500
Daytona 500
NASCAR races at Daytona International Speedway